The John Wood Mansion was built between 1835 and 1838 by John Wood, who in 1860 became the 12th governor of Illinois on the death of Governor William Bissell. The Wood family moved into the Greek Revival home situated at 12th and State Streets in Quincy, Illinois from an unusual two-story log cabin in 1837. Quincy is the county seat of Adams County. Wood founded both the county (1825) and city (1835).

Wood's 14-room mansion was built by John Cleaveland and endured a move from its original site to its current location, about a block east, so Wood could build an even larger mansion. The Greek Revival building was added to the National Register of Historic Places on April 17, 1970, and in 2007 was named by the Association of Independent Architects one of Illinois' 150 most important architectural structures.  The John Wood Mansion features four large Doric columns, which Wood himself turned at a lathe he built for that purpose, four large chimneys and many ornate details inside and out. A great many original Wood family and period furnishings are displayed throughout the mansion. Today it is owned and operated by the Historical Society of Quincy and Adams County.

The house is open for public tours from April through October.  The Society also offers educational tours of the house to all local 3rd and 4th grade students each year, as well as special candlelight tours open to the public in December.

In celebration of the 2018 Illinois Bicentennial, the John Wood Mansion was selected as one of the Illinois 200 Great Places  by the American Institute of Architects Illinois component (AIA Illinois).

See also
 Chaddock College

Notes

External links

National Register nomination
Historical Society of Quincy and Adams County
John Wood Mansion
Society of Architectural Historians SAH ARCHIPEDIA entry on John Wood Mansion

Houses in Adams County, Illinois
Historic house museums in Illinois
Museums in Adams County, Illinois
National Register of Historic Places in Adams County, Illinois
Houses on the National Register of Historic Places in Illinois
Abraham Lincoln National Heritage Area
Buildings and structures in Quincy, Illinois
Tourist attractions in Quincy, Illinois